Yun Dukan (born 1942) is a Korean taekwondo grandmaster. A contemporary of martial art masters Hwang Kee, Nam Tae Hi, Jung Won Sun, Chang Gedo and Kim Il Woong, he brought his style of taekwondo to the United States in 1968.

Biography

Yun was raised in what is now known as South Korea, and is a survivor of both the Japanese occupation of Korea and the Korean War.  His childhood education included training in the martial art of Moo Duk Kwan under the master Oh Sae Joon.  Subsequently, he twice won the national championships of Korea, and gained the attention of Sang Kyu Shim, who asked him to assist in the teaching of the 1st and 2nd battalions of the Republic of Korea marines; Yun also  taught the 1st Cavalry division of the United States Army in Munsan, Korea. It was during this period that Shim introduced him to Choi Hong Hi, from him Yun learned taekwondo along with the Cha Soo Young, Moon Ku Baek, and Jung Joong Sun.

Yun later joined the Oh Do Kwan in Seoul, where he trained with E Jhoon Chang. There he began to learn and teach the International Taekwon-Do Federation (ITF) style of taekwondo.  In 1968, Yun, with the encouragement of both Choi and Shim, came to Manitowoc, Wisconsin and began teaching taekwondo at Manitowoc YMCA as part of the ITF's effort to bring the martial art to the Americas.  In 1970, Yun moved to Milwaukee, Wisconsin, and established the first taekwondo school in the city. In 1971, Yun's school was visited by Choi Hong Hi and Nam Tae Hi, who taught at the first of many seminars that they were to host. As of 2004, Yun's school had four branches, all located in the United States midwest.

Sources

Further reading
Yun, Dukan. (1981). Tae Kwon-Do for Women: New Path to Self-Discovery. Tae Kwon Do Times Magazine, 1(1), 40–41.
Yun, Duk An. (1981). Self-Defense Techniques Duk An Yun.  Tae Kwon Do Times Magazine, 1(3), 22–23.

External links
D.A.Yun's Black Belt Academy United Taekwon-Do Federation, Inc. Homepage
D.A.Yun's Taekwondo Information

South Korean male taekwondo practitioners
Living people
1942 births